The 2011 United States state legislative elections were held on November 8, 2011. Eight legislative chambers in four states held regularly-scheduled elections. These off-year elections coincided with other state and local elections, including gubernatorial elections in four states.

These were the first elections to be affected by redistricting after the 2010 census, except in the case of Mississippi, where partisan differences prevented new maps from being passed in time. 

Republicans flipped control of the Virginia Senate, thereby establishing a trifecta. In Mississippi, Republicans won the state House for the first time since 1876, and solidified control of the state Senate after several Democrats switched parties earlier in the year, giving Republicans control of the chamber. Republicans obtained a trifecta in the state for the first time since 1876 as a result. In Louisiana, Republicans solidified control of both houses of the legislature after several Democrats switched parties at the beginning of the year, which gave Republicans a trifecta there for the first time since 1873.

Summary table 
Regularly-scheduled elections were held in 8 of the 99 state legislative chambers in the United States. Nationwide, regularly-scheduled elections were held for 578 of the 7,383 legislative seats. This table only covers regularly-scheduled elections; additional special elections took place concurrently with these regularly-scheduled elections.

State summaries

Louisiana 
All seats of the Louisiana State Senate and the Louisiana House of Representatives were up for election to four-year terms in single-member districts. Republicans flipped both chambers through party switching and special elections earlier in the year, and then retained majority control in both chambers in the general election.

Mississippi 
All seats of the Mississippi State Senate and the Mississippi House of Representatives were up for election to four-year terms in single-member districts. Republicans won a majority in the lower house. They had previously won a majority in the upper house through party switching and special elections earlier in the year, and then retained a majority in the general election.

New Jersey 
All seats of the New Jersey Senate and the New Jersey General Assembly were up for election. In 2011, senators were elected to two-year terms in single-member districts, while Assembly members were elected to two-year terms in two-member districts. Democrats retained majority control in both chambers.

Virginia 
All seats of the Senate of Virginia and the Virginia House of Delegates were up for election in single-member districts. Senators were elected to four-year terms, while delegates serve terms of two years. Republicans maintained control of the lower chamber and won control of the upper chamber because the Republican lieutenant governor broke the ties in the now-evenly split body.

See also 
 2011 United States gubernatorial elections

Notes

References 

 
State legislative elections
State legislature elections in the United States by year